The 2019–20 Moroccan Throne Cup was the 64th staging of the Moroccan Throne Cup, the main knockout football tournament in Morocco. The final was played at the Adrar stadium in Agadir, on 14 May 2022. AS FAR became the champions by beating Moghreb Tétouan with 3–0 in the final.

Preliminary round

Fourth round
Draw of the 2019–20 Moroccan Throne Cup final phase

The fourth round was played on 15–17 December 2020.

 North group

|}

 South group

|}

Final phase

Qualified teams
The following teams competed in the 2019–20 Moroccan Throne Cup.

16 teams of 2019–20 Botola

AS FAR
Difaâ El Jadidi
FUS Rabat
Hassania Agadir
IR Tanger
Moghreb Tétouan
Mouloudia Oujda
Nahdat Zemamra
Olympic Safi
Olympique Khouribga
Raja Beni Mellal
Raja Casablanca
Rapide Oued Zem
RSB Berkane
Wydad Casablanca
Youssoufia Berrechid

9 teams of 2019–20 Botola 2

Chabab Mohammédia
Maghreb de Fès
Wydad de Fès
Chabab Atlas Khénifra
Ittihad Khemisset
Kawkab Marrakech
AS Salé
Club Jeunesse Ben Guerir
Union Sidi Kacem

5 teams of 2019–20 Division Nationale

Union de Touarga
Wydad Serghini
Olympique Youssoufia
Club Rachad Bernoussi
Mouloudia Dakhla

2 teams of 2019–20 Championnat du Maroc Amateurs II

Difâa Hamrya Khénifra (Northeast group)
Ittifaq Marrakech (South group)

Bracket
Draw of the 2019–20 Moroccan Throne Cup final phase

Round of 32
The Round of 32 matches were played on 29–30 December 2020 and 1–3 January 2021.

Round of 16
The Round of 16 matches were played on 2–4 March and 20 April 2021.

Quarter-finals
The Quarter-finals matches were played on 4–6 May 2021.

Semi-finals
The Semi-finals matches were played 1 August 2021.

Final 
<onlyinclude>

References

External links
Coupe du Trone: Résultats, frmf.ma
Moroccan Cup 2019 - 2020, Goalzz.com

Morocco
Coupe
Coupe